Kanaka Simhasanam is a 2006 Indian Malayalam-language comedy film directed by Rajasenan. The film stars Jayaram, Karthika, and Lakshmi Gopalaswamy.

Plot

The movie tells the story of Kanakambaran, who runs a drama troupe along with his wife Bharati. The company is operating at a loss, but the couple struggle to keep it going as their creditors are breathing down their necks.

One day, they strike gold when Udaya Varma and Ramakrishnan ask them to take part a real-life drama: they want Kanakambaran to play Suryanarayanan, the heir to the throne of the palace and childhood sweetheart of the princess Kanjanalakshmi. Kanakambaran takes up the challenge and also places his wife as the cook at the royal palace; in the meantime, a bad guy Narasimhan also has an eye for Kanjanalakshmi.

After many days Kanakambaran learns that he was originally Suryanarayanan who was adopted by the palace cook. After a fight, Kanakambaran returns to drama world and Narasimhan becomes a good man. Later, Kanjanalakshmi is married to Narasimhan. The story ends with the song of the drama couples dancing.

Cast 
 Jayaram as Kasargode Kanakambaran/ Sooryanarayana Varma
 Karthika Mathew as Marthandom Bharathi/ Sasikala
 Lakshmi Gopalaswamy as Kanjanalakshmi
 Suraj Venjaramoodu as Gopalan, Bharathi's brother
 Baby Nayanthara as Ammutty, Kasargode Kanakambaran's daughter
 Janardhanan as Upendra Varma
 Bheeman Raghu as Radhakrishna Varma
 Kalasala Babu as Indrasena Reddy, Guruji the Royal advisor.
 Geetha Salam Rishikesha Kaimal, Kanakambaran's adopter who previously worked as the chef in the royal palace.
 Kochu Preman as Chennakeshav Reddy
 Saju Kodiyan
 Kiran Raj as Narasimha Raju
 Subi Suresh as Tripurasundari

Soundtrack
M. Jayachandran has composed the music and has set five tunes for the film.

1 "Priyathame" by K. J. Yesudas & K. S. Chithra
2 "Sundarano" by Sujatha [Raga: Punnagavarali]
3 "Azhakaarnna" by Sankaran Namboothiri, Ganga & Priya [Raga: Begada]
4 "Sundarano" by M. Jayachandran & Sujatha [Raga: Punnagavarali]

References

External links

2000s Malayalam-language films
2006 films
Films directed by Rajasenan
Films scored by M. Jayachandran